Haldukhata  is a village under  tehsil Kotdwar in the Pauri Garhwal district of Indian state of Uttarakhand. Haldukhata is connecting place for Kalaghati and Kishanpuri.

Villages in Pauri Garhwal district